The .300 Rook, also known as the .295 Rook (by Holland & Holland only), is an obsolete centerfire rifle cartridge.

Overview
The .300 Rook is a rimmed cartridge originally designed for use in rook rifles for hunting small game and target shooting. 

A variant, the short lived .300 Rook target, was loaded with a heavier  bullet as it was felt the original loading was too light for distance target shooting, as wind had an effect on the trajectory as well as bullet drop over longer distances.

History
The origins of the .300 Rook are uncertain although it was introduced before 1874, it became one of the most popular British rook cartridges, also being chambered in several revolvers. In later years its popularity was eroded by the .255 Jeffery Rook and to Holland & Holland's .297/250 Rook.

The .300 Rook cartridge case was lengthened to create the .300 Sherwood, which in turn superseded the .300 Rook target variant. As with other rook rifle cartridges, the .300 Rook was superseded by the .22 Long Rifle.

See also
Rook rifle
List of rifle cartridges
7 mm rifle cartridges

References

Footnotes

Bibliography
 Barnes, Frank C., Cartridges of the World, 15th ed, Gun Digest Books, Iola, 2016, .
 Cartridgecollector, ".300 Rook target", cartridgecollector.net, retrieved 20 April 2017.
 Imperial War Museums, "7.62 x 29.5R : Kynoch ; .300 Rook Rifle & .295 Rook Rifle", iwm.org.uk, retrieved 20 April 2017.
 Municon, ".295 Rook", municion.org , retrieved 20 April 2017.
 Wieland, Terry, "In praise of Rook Rifles", huntforever.org , retrieved 20 April 2017.

External links
 Ammo-One, "300 (295) Rook", ammo-one.com, retrieved 20 April 2017.
 Cartridgecollector, "300 Rook (295) 1.16 inch", cartridgecollector.net, retrieved 20 April 2017.

Pistol and rifle cartridges
British firearm cartridges
Rook rifle cartridges